Elbridge Ayer (E. A.) Burbank (August 10, 1858 – April 21, 1949) was an American artist who sketched and painted more than 1200 portraits of Native Americans from 125 tribes. He studied art in Chicago and in his 30s traveled to Munich, Germany for additional studies with notable German artists.  He is believed to be the only person to paint the war chief Geronimo from life.

Early life and education
Elbridge was born on August 10, 1858 in Harvard, Illinois to Anna Maria (Ayer) and Abner Jewett Burbank. After attending public schools, he started art studies at the Chicago Academy of Design, where he was influenced by Leonard Volk and graduated in 1874.

His maternal uncle Edward E. Ayer was a successful business magnate, museum philanthropist and antiquarian collector.  He collected books, original manuscripts and other materials relating to the history and ethnology of Native American peoples at the time of European encounter. His collection, one of the founding donations to the Newberry Library in Chicago, contains a number of Burbank's works.

Career

Burbank was the only artist to paint Geronimo from life. He painted or sketched more than 1,200 Native Americans from 125 tribes.  Over a period of several years, he spent many months at the Hubbell Trading Post, where he studied and painted Native Americans. Burbank, Oklahoma is named after him.

In 1910, the Editor of The Harvard Independent noted: “No other artist in the country has enjoyed the opportunities experienced by Mr. E. A. Burbank, now a resident of Los Angeles - the painter of Indian portraits, to meet face to face, and on their own ground, the once noted Indian chiefs America now so rapidly passing away. For the last twenty years Mr. Burbank has journeyed from camp to camp among the aborigines of the northwest and southwest, painting successively all the great warriors whose prowess has made their names famous in frontier history. It is, therefore, with considerable pride that The Graphic calls attention to a series of articles from Mr. Burbank's pen, describing his personal interviews with these once-powerful war chiefs, and illustrated by portraits from life, re-drawn in pencil especially for the Graphic, from his original studies. First in this notable galaxy was a picture and story of Red Cloud, the famous Ogallalla (sic) Sioux, recently deceased. Geronimo, the noted Apache chief who preceded Red Cloud the happy hunting grounds by a few months, followed."

Burbank arranged for two periods of extended study in Munich, Germany with notable artists. In 1886-87 he studied with Paul Navin and Frederick Fehr.  He returned a couple of years later, when he studied from 1889 to 1890 with Toby Rosenthal. He also traveled to Oberammergau, Germany; Cardiff, Wales; and Fort Sill, Oklahoma.

As an adult, Burbank was diagnosed with bipolar disorder, referred to then as "manic depression". He was treated at several different facilities during his life, most notably for more than ten years at the State Mental Hospital in Napa, California.

He died April 21, 1949 in San Francisco, California after being struck and severely injured by a cable car on January 27. The accident occurred in front of the Manx Hotel (now the Villa Florence). He was first buried at Mt. Olivet Memorial Park, San Francisco, California, but his remains were reinterred at Forest View Abby in Rockford, Illinois. In 1984 relatives had his remains moved and reinterred at Mount Auburn Cemetery, Harvard, Illinois.

Son of the Shadow-Maker 

In 1898, Burbank became friends with Chief Blue Horse when he was visiting the Oglala Lakota at Pine Ridge Agency. 
Burbank painted sitting portraits of the greatest Native American leaders, including Geronimo, Red Cloud and Chief Joseph. At the time, Chief Blue Horse was eighty years of age and rode each day on his horse to pose for Burbank, who he called “Son of the Shadow-Maker.” Burbank was also an historian and his fond recollections illuminate Chief Blue Horse. “Hardly a day passed without Blue Horse coming to my studio to visit me. He would sit down and smoke a little, short, strong pipe and gossip with the other Indians present; all the time he was talking he would be fanning himself with the wing of a turkey. His face usually was painted red, and he wore all the Indian clothes he had, with a single feather on his head. He was a thorough Indian, and extremely kind-hearted. His principal object in life was to try to make others happy around him.”

Works of art

Tribes portrayed
(note: viewed by name used by Burbank, but linked to current tribal page)
Acoma * Agua Caliente * Apache * Arapahoe * Cahuilla * Campo * Cheyenne * Chimevava * Cochiti Pueblo * Columbia * Comanche * Coo-Koo-Lah * Crow * Desert Calmilla * Desert Cahuilla * Diegueno * Digeno * Digger * Hualapai * Hopi * Hoopa * Isleta Pueblo * Jemez * Jicarilla Apache * Jule River * Kabahimen * Kickapoo * Kiowa * Kobalthnent * Laguna Pueblo * Lower Klamath * Mad River * Maidu * Meteneck * Meuwock * Modoc * Mohave * Moqui * Na-Po * Nambe * Napa * Navajo * Nez Perces * Nomelacki * Ottawa * Panamint * Papago * Pala * Picuris * Pima * Poma * Pomo * Pueblo * Sac and Fox * San Felipe * San Felipe Pueblo * San Felippo * San Ignacio * San Luis Rey * Sandia Pueblo * Santa Ana Pueblo * Santa Clara * Seranno * Shawnee * Sioux * Soboba * South Fork Paiute * Southern Cheyenne * Sun Pum * Southern Ute * Tejon * Temecula * Tewa * Tule River * Ukiah * Ukiah Saiaz * Ukie * Ute * Washoe * Wylackie * Yackima * Yaqui * Yuma * Yuma Apache * Walpi * Zia Pueblo * Zuni

Holding institutions
Art Institute of Chicago
American Museum of Natural History
Beinecke Rare Book and Manuscript Library - Yale University
Butler Institute of American Art
C. M. Russell Museum
Harvard-Diggins Library
Hearst Art Gallery, Saint Mary's College of California
The Huntington Library, Art Collections, and Botanical Gardens
Hubbell Trading Post National Historic Site - National Park Service
Luther Burbank Home & Gardens
Museum of the America West
Newberry Library
Peabody Museum of Archeology and Ethnology - Harvard University
Phoenix Art Museum
Rockford Art Museum
Smithsonian American Art Museum

See also
 George Catlin
 Maynard Dixon
 Seth and Mary Eastman
 Don Lorenzo Hubbell
 Paul Kane
 W. Langdon Kihn
 Charles Bird King
 Joseph Henry Sharp
 John Mix Stanley

References

Published works
Burbank Among the Indians, Caxton Press, 1944. Placed online with permission of Caxton Press
From the summary of "A Portfolio of Ten of His "Red Head" Indian Sketches" from the J. L. Hubbell Collection-Ganado, Azizona.

External links
Burbank Timeline
Harvard-Diggins Library
Elbridge Ayer Burbank Papers at the Newberry Library

1858 births
1949 deaths
19th-century American painters
American male painters
20th-century American painters
American illustrators
American ethnologists
People from Harvard, Illinois
People with bipolar disorder
19th-century American male artists
20th-century American male artists